Vijayawada Lingampalli Intercity Express (Train No: 12795/12796) is a daily Superfast train that runs between Vijayawada Junction in Andhra Pradesh and Lingampalli in Telangana. This train belongs to Vijayawada Division of South Central Railway Zone.

History
This train service was introduced in 2018, mainly for the convenience of Andhra Pradesh government employees commuting between Andhra Pradesh Capital Region and Hyderabad. The Vijayawada-Secunderabad Intercity Express was flagged off to a start on 20 June 2016 by Indian Railway Minister Suresh Prabhu and Chief Minister N. Chandrababu Naidu as the first-ever non-stop train between Guntur and Secunderabad.

The train route initially originated from Secunderabad but was later extended up to Lingampalli in Hyderabad.

Route and Halts

Traction 
It is hauled by a Lallaguda-based WAP-7 and Vijayawada-based WAP-7 locomotive.

See also 
 Pinakini Express
 Satavahana Express
 Ratnachal Express
 Vijayawada-Gudur Intercity Express

References 

Transport in Vijayawada
Transport in Secunderabad
Railway services introduced in 2016
Intercity Express (Indian Railways) trains
Rail transport in Andhra Pradesh
Rail transport in Telangana